Alícia Correia (born 29 April 2003) is a Portuguese professional footballer who plays as a defender for Sporting CP and the Portugal national team.

Club career
Correia signed a professional contract with Sporting CP on 19 November 2020, at the age of 17.

International career
Correia made her debut for the Portugal national team on 23 October 2020 against Cyprus.

References

2003 births
Living people
Women's association football defenders
Portuguese women's footballers
Portugal women's international footballers
Sportspeople from Barreiro, Portugal
Sporting CP (women's football) players
Campeonato Nacional de Futebol Feminino players
UEFA Women's Euro 2022 players